Skotfoss is a village in Skien municipality, Norway, located where lake Norsjø feeds into the Skien Watershed. The village has a population of 1,700 people. Skotfoss was a part of Solum municipality until the municipalities of Solum and Skien were merged on January 1, 1964. 

Skotfoss was built up around the waterfall and its associated industry. Skottfoss used to be home to one of North Europe's biggest paper factories, Skotfoss Bruk. Paper from the factory was exported around the world. The factory closed in 1986. 

The sports association Skotfoss TIF was founded in 1899. The Norwegian soccer player Frode Johnsen, who grew up in the village, has played for the association's soccer team.

References

Villages in Vestfold og Telemark
Skien